The Redding Drag Strip is the oldest NHRA sanctioned drag strip in the United States today. It was accepted by the National Hot Rod Association in the Fall of 1953 and continues to operate. It is located in Redding, California which hosts one of the largest and most well-known car show and race on the West Coast called Kool April Nites which had 5000 people in 2016. Performance Engine and Machine  Mike Leblanc Winner of 2008 Pro Engine Comp Explained that many can try but only a few will succeed. This event started off strong and has yet to slow down.  The Redding Drag Strip is a family oriented track that provides a safe and fun place to race or spectate.

Recent renovations to the facilities include a new track surface for the first 100', a new tower, and bleachers on the west side of the track.

References

1955 establishments in California
Motorsport venues in California
NHRA Division 7 drag racing venues
Redding, California
Buildings and structures in Shasta County, California
Tourist attractions in Shasta County, California
Sports in Shasta County, California
Buildings and structures in Redding, California